Chris Jones (born September 25, 1967) is the head coach and general manager of the Edmonton Elks of the Canadian Football League (CFL). He was previously the head coach and general manager of the Saskatchewan Roughriders for three seasons, after serving as the head coach of the Edmonton Eskimos for two seasons. Jones previously served as the defensive coordinator for the Montreal Alouettes, Calgary Stampeders and Toronto Argonauts before becoming a head coach. Jones won four Grey Cup rings with four teams between 2002 and 2015.

College career
Born in South Pittsburg, Tennessee, Jones played college football for the University of Tennessee at Chattanooga as a walk-on, and received little playing time. Instead, he began focusing on a coaching career.

Coaching career

NCAA career 
Jones began his coaching career at North Jackson High School in Stevenson, Alabama, helping the team win a state championship in 1993. He began coaching NCAA football at Tennessee Tech University in 1995, where he served as a graduate assistant under head coach Jim Ragland. After serving one season as a graduate assistant at the University of Alabama, he joined the University of Tennessee at Martin coaching staff as a defensive line coach in 1998. He returned to Tennessee Tech in 1999 as a defensive line coach and recruiting coordinator.

Early CFL career 
Jones moved to the CFL in 2002, after being an assistant coach for Arena League Las Vegas in the spring and summer, after being named the new defensive line coach of the Montreal Alouettes helping Montreal win the 90th Grey Cup. He remained there until 2007. In 2008, he was named defensive coordinator of the Calgary Stampeders, which won the 96th Grey Cup, and was promoted to Assistant Coach in 2010. He later joined the Toronto Argonauts as Defensive Coordinator and was part of the team that won the 100th Grey Cup.

Edmonton Eskimos 
Jones was named head coach of the Edmonton Eskimos in November 2013. After a 12-6 2014 season, he was nominated for CFL Coach of the Year. Jones was nominated as the West representative for coach of the year in 2015 after winning 14 of the 18 regular season games. The East representative and winner was former Eskimos assistant coach Rick Campbell. Jones' Eskimos were victorious over the Ottawa Redblacks in the 103rd Grey Cup game. Following the season the divisional rival Saskatchewan Roughriders were given permission by GM Ed Hervey to entering into negotiations to fill their vacant head coaching position.

Saskatchewan Roughriders 
On December 7, 2015, a mere week after winning the 2015 Grey Cup, it was announced that Jones would be the new general manager and head coach of the Saskatchewan Roughriders. After a disappointing 3-15 season in 2015 Jones took over in 2016 and things got off to a poor start, as the team won only one of their first 11 games. However, down the stretch they would win four of the remaining seven games and finish with a record of 5-13. 2017 saw the Riders return to being a competitive team, as the club qualified for the playoffs for the first time since 2014. After defeating the Ottawa Redblacks in a crossover playoff game the Riders were bested by the Toronto Argonauts who would go on to win the 105th Grey Cup. Following the season the Riders extended Jones' contract through the 2019 CFL season. Jones and the Riders continued to improve in the 2018 season, accumulating 12 wins, but in the playoffs they were defeated by the Winnipeg Blue Bombers. On January 8, 2019 Jones and the Riders agreed to a new two-year contract extension.

Cleveland Browns 
On January 15, 2019, one week after signing a contract extension with the Roughriders, Jones resigned from the Roughriders to take a two-year contract with the Cleveland Browns as their Senior Defensive Specialist. After one season, Jones was removed from the coaching staff with the hire of new head coach Kevin Stefanski and placed in an office position for the 2020 season.

South Pittsburg High School 
In April 2021, Jones was named the head coach of his high school Alma Mater, the South Pittsburg Pirates in Marion County, Tennessee. He notably ended the school's nearly century-old rivalry game with neighboring Marion County High School for the 2021 and 2022 seasons, in part due to suspicions that a Marion County fan turned South Pittsburg in for recruiting violations during the 2020 season, resulting in South Pittsburg being placed on probation. Jones resigned from the position on September 13 after coaching only one game, a win against Sequatchie County High School, in order to return to a defensive position with the Toronto Argonauts.

Return to CFL
On September 21, 2021, the Toronto Argonauts announced they had hired Chris Jones as a defensive consultant. Two months later, on December 21, 2021, it was announced that Jones had returned to Edmonton to become the head coach and general manager of the renamed Edmonton Elks.

Personal life
Jones has a son from his first marriage and two daughters with his second wife.

CFL coaching record

References

External links
 CFL coaching record

1966 births
Living people
Alabama Crimson Tide football coaches
Calgary Stampeders coaches
Chattanooga Mocs football players
Cleveland Browns coaches
Edmonton Elks coaches
Las Vegas Gladiators coaches
Montreal Alouettes coaches
Saskatchewan Roughriders coaches
Saskatchewan Roughriders general managers
Tennessee Tech Golden Eagles football coaches
Tennessee Technological University alumni
Toronto Argonauts coaches
UT Martin Skyhawks football coaches
High school football coaches in Alabama
People from South Pittsburg, Tennessee